Vasilios Fasidis (born 22 June 1996) is a Greek professional footballer who plays as a winger for Super League 2 club Veria.

References

1996 births
Living people
Greek footballers
Xanthi F.C. players
Greece youth international footballers
Super League Greece players
Association football midfielders
Footballers from Veria
PAOK FC B players
PAOK FC players
Aiginiakos F.C. players
Trikala B.C. players